Curettage ( or ), in medical procedures, is the use of a curette (French, meaning scoop) to remove tissue by scraping or scooping.

Curettages are also a method of abortion.  It has been replaced by vacuum aspiration over the last decade.

Curettage has been used to treat teeth affected by periodontitis.

Curettage is also a major method used for removing osteoid osteoma and osteoblastoma.

Curettage with subsequent culture is more accurate than ulcer base swan culture or aspiration and culture for diabetic foot ulcers.

Curettage is also used when excising a chalazion of the eyelid.

See also
 Dilation and curettage

References

Diagnostic obstetrics and gynaecology
Surgical procedures and techniques